Paolo Rudelli (born 16 July 1970) is an Italian archbishop and diplomat of the Holy See who serves as Apostolic Nuncio to Zimbabwe.

Biography
Paolo Rudelli was born on 16 July 1970 in Gazzaniga in Lombardy, Italy. He comes from Gandino in the Province of Bergamo. On 10 June 1995, he was ordained a priest of the Diocese of Bergamo. He completed his theological studies at the Pontifical Gregorian University in Rome, where he received a doctoral degree in moral theology and a licenciate in canon law. In 1998 he began his preparation for the diplomatic service at the Pontifical Ecclesiastical Academy. On 1 July 2001, he entered the diplomatic service of the Holy See and worked in the nunciatures in Ecuador (2001–2003) and Poland (2003–2006) and then worked in the Section for General Affairs of the Secretariat of State.

On 20 September 2014, Pope Francis appointed him Permanent Observer of the Holy See to the Council of Europe in Strasbourg, just a month before Francis' visit to Strasbourg.

On 3 September 2019, Pope Francis named him a titular archbishop and gave him the title of apostolic nuncio. He was replaced in Strasbourg on 21 September 2019 by Marco Ganci. He received his episcopal consecration from Francis on 4 October. On 25 January 2020, Pope Francis named him Apostolic Nuncio to Zimbabwe.

Writings

See also
 List of heads of the diplomatic missions of the Holy See

References

Permanent Observers of the Holy See to the Council of Europe
Apostolic Nuncios to Zimbabwe
Pontifical Gregorian University alumni
Clergy from the Province of Bergamo
1970 births
Living people
People from Gazzaniga